The following streetcar lines once operated in Brooklyn, New York City, New York, United States.

History
The history of surface line operation in Brooklyn is long and very complicated, and is best presented under one of the following sub-articles which maintain the proper family tree for each of the lines listed below. These subsidiary articles are:

BRT/BMT subsidiaries
Brooklyn and Queens Transit Corporation, the main company after 1929
Brooklyn City Railroad
Brooklyn Heights Railroad
Brooklyn, Queens County and Suburban Railroad
Coney Island and Brooklyn Railroad
Coney Island and Gravesend Railway
Nassau Electric Railroad

Companies not owned by the BRT/BMT or jointly owned
Brooklyn and North River Railroad
Bush Terminal Railroad
Coney Island, Sheepshead Bay and Ocean Avenue Railroad
Manhattan Bridge Three Cent Line
Marine Railway
Maspeth Railroad and Bridge Company
Van Brunt Street and Erie Basin Railroad

BMT
Almost every surface line in Brooklyn eventually came under control of the Brooklyn and Queens Transit Corporation, a subsidiary of the Brooklyn–Manhattan Transit Corporation, prior to the takeover of the lines by the New York City Board of Transportation on June 5, 1940. Many of the lines ended at the Brooklyn Bridge in downtown Brooklyn or Williamsburg Bridge in Williamsburg, with some going over to the Park Row or Essex Street terminals in Manhattan. The small number of BMT streetcar lines that operated only in Queens are also included here.

Other companies

See also
 Trolley dodger
 List of streetcar lines in the Bronx
 List of streetcar lines in Manhattan
 List of streetcar lines in Queens
 List of streetcar lines in Staten Island
 List of streetcar lines on Long Island
 List of town tramway systems in the United States

Maps 
 Interactive map of New York streetcar network
 BMT map

References
Williams Map and Guide Company, Map of the borough of Queens, 1923
Chicago Transit & Railfan Web Site: New York City Transit
The Don Harold and Francis J. Goldsmith, Jr. Brooklyn El and Trolley Pages (The JoeKorNer: Brooklyn Trolleys)
Brooklyn Streetcars, by the Branford Electric Railway Association,  September 24, 2008 

Brooklyn Trolleys James Clifford Greller Xplorer Press 

 
  Streetcar lines
Brooklyn
Brooklyn-related lists